Miss Grand Costa Rica 2022 was the first edition of the Miss Grand Costa Rica beauty pageant, held at the Eugene O'Neill Theatre in  San José on July 7, 2022. She then represented Costa Rica in the Miss Grand International 2022 pageant held on October 25 in Indonesia, but got a non-placement. 

The event was hosted by Catalina Murillo, Sasa Gomez, and Henry Wood.

Following the end of the international tournament, due to such an unsatisfactory competition result, some Costa Ricans accused the national organizers of a lack of preparation and mismanagement of Brenda's English language training before entering the international contest. The country's licensee, Erick Solís, was also blamed for using Brenda only for business purposes.

Results

Final placements

Grand final selection committee
The following list is the panel of judges for the grand final competition of the Miss Grand Costa Rica 2022 pageant.

 Andrea Aguilera Paredes – First runner-up Miss Grand International 2021 from Ecuador
 Maricrís Rodríguez – Miss United Continents Costa Rica 2019 
 Adriana Moya – Miss Grand Costa Rica 2021
 Gabriela Jara – Miss Grand Costa Rica 2020
 Brenda Castro – Miss Grand Costa Rica 2019
 Amalia Matamoros – Miss Grand Costa Rica 2017
 Viviana Rodríguez – CEO of WM Top Models Agency
 Daniel Meza –  Sales director of the Dreams Las Mareas Hotel
 Alejandro Venegas – Regional director of the sports facility brand, Penalty

Contestants
Twelve contestants competed for the title of Miss Grand Costa Rica 2022.

References

External links

 

Miss Grand Costa Rica
Grand Costa Rica